Edward Joseph Blackwell (October 10, 1929 – October 7, 1992) was an American jazz drummer born in New Orleans, Louisiana, known for his extensive, influential work with Ornette Coleman.

Biography
Blackwell's early career began in New Orleans in the 1950s.  He played in a bebop quintet that included pianist Ellis Marsalis and clarinetist Alvin Batiste. There was also a brief stint touring with Ray Charles. The second line parade music of New Orleans greatly influenced Blackwell's drumming style and could be heard in his playing throughout his career.

Blackwell first came to national attention as the drummer with Ornette Coleman's quartet around 1960, when he took over for Billy Higgins in the quartet's stand at the Five Spot in New York City. He is known as one of the great innovators of the free jazz of the 1960s, fusing New Orleans and African rhythms with bebop. In the 1970s and 1980s, Blackwell toured and recorded extensively with fellow Ornette Quartet veterans Don Cherry, Charlie Haden, and Dewey Redman in the quartet, Old and New Dreams.

In the late 1970s Blackwell became an Artist-in-Residence at Wesleyan University in Middletown, Connecticut. Blackwell was a beloved figure on the Wesleyan Campus until he died.

In 1981, he performed at the Woodstock Jazz Festival, held in celebration of the tenth anniversary of the Creative Music Studio. "The Ed Blackwell Project" members were Mark Helias, bass, Carlos Ward, alto sax/flute, and Graham Haynes (son of drummer Roy Haynes), cornet.

Death
After years of kidney problems, Blackwell died in 1992. The following year he was inducted into the Down Beat Jazz Hall of Fame.

Discography

As leader
1993: What It Is? Ed Blackwell Project Vol. 1 (Enja)
1994: What It Be Like? Ed Blackwell Project Vol. 2 (Enja)
1996: Walls–Bridges (Black Saint)

With Old and New Dreams
 Old and New Dreams (Black Saint, 1976)
 Old and New Dreams (ECM, 1979)
 Playing (ECM, 1980)
 A Tribute to Blackwell (Black Saint, 1987)

As sideman

With Ray Anderson
Every One Of Us (Gramavision)
With Bill Barron
Jazz Caper (Muse, 1978 [1982])
With Karl Berger
Karl Berger (ESP Disk)
Tune In (Milestone)
Just Play 1976 (Quark)
Transit w/ Dave Holland (Black Saint)
Crystal Fire (Quark)
With Jane Ira Bloom
Mighty Lights (Enja)
With David Bond
The Key of Life (Vineyard)
With Charles Brackeen
Rhythm X (Strata-East, 1973)
With Anthony Braxton
Six Compositions: Quartet (Antilles, 1982)
With Marion Brown
Vista (Impulse!, 1975)
Awofofora (Disco Mate)
With Ornette Coleman
This Is Our Music (Atlantic, 1960)
Free Jazz: A Collective Improvisation (Atlantic, 1960)
Ornette! (Atlantic, 1961)
Ornette on Tenor (Atlantic, 1961)
The Complete Science Fiction Sessions
Beauty Is a Rare Thing (Rhino/Atlantic)
The Art of the Improvisers (Atlantic)
Twins (Atlantic)
To Whom Who Keeps a Record (Atlantic)
Live in Milano 1968 (Jazz Up)
The Unprecedented Music Of Ornette Coleman (Lotus Passport)
Friends and Neighbors: Live at Prince Street (Flying Dutchman)
Broken Shadows (Columbia, 1971)
Science Fiction (Columbia, 1971)
Live in Paris 1971 (Jazz Row)
The Belgrade Concert (Jazz Door)
European Concert (Unique Jazz)
Paris Concert (Trio)
Skies of America (Columbia)
Stating The Case (Jazz Anthology)
With Steve Coleman
Rhythm in Mind (RCA/Novus)
With Alice Coltrane
Carnegie Hall '71 (Hi Hat, 2018)
With Don Cherry
Complete Communion (Blue Note)
The Avant-Garde (with John Coltrane as co-leader)
Symphony for Improvisers (Blue Note)
Where is Brooklyn? (Blue Note)
El Corazón (ECM, 1982)
Mu First Part (BYG Actuel, 1969)
Mu Second Part (BYG Actuel, 1970)
Broken Shadows (Moon)
Relativity Suite (JCOA)
Tamma with Don Cherry and Ed Blackwell (Odin)
Multikuti (A&M, 1990)
Live at the Bracknell Jazz Festival, 1986 (BBC, 2002)
With Jayne Cortez
Everywhere Drums (Bola Press)

With Stanley Cowell
Regeneration (Strata East, 1976)
With Anthony Davis
Song for the Old World (India Navigation, 1978)
With Eric Dolphy
At the Five Spot, Vols 1 & 2
Memorial Album (Prestige)
Here and There (Prestige)
Dash One (Prestige)
With Dewey Redman 
Tarik (BYG Actuel, 1969)
Red and Black in Willisau (Black Saint, 1980)
The Struggle Continues (ECM)
With Charlie Haden
The Montreal Tapes: with Don Cherry and Ed Blackwell (Verve, 1989 [1994])
With Albert Heath
Kawaida (O'Be)
With Clifford Jordan
Lee Morgan w/ Clifford Jordan Quintet-Live in Baltimore 1968 (Fresh Sound)
In the World (Strata-East, 1969 [1972])
With Joe Lovano 
From the Soul (Blue Note)
Sounds of Joy (Enja)
With Jemeel Moondoc
Judy's Bounce (Soul Note, 1982)
With David Murray
Morning Song (Black Saint)
Ming's Samba (Portrait)
Death of a Sideman (DIW)
With Art Neville
What's Going On" (Specialty)
That Old Time Rock 'N' Roll" (Specialty)
With Yoko Ono
Plastic Ono Band (Apple)
With Hilton Ruiz
Cross Currents (Stash)
With Archie Shepp
Further Fire Music (Impulse!)
On This Night (GRP/Impulse!)
The Magic of Ju-Ju (Impulse!)
With Bob Stewart
Goin' Home (JMT, 1989)
With Mal Waldron
Breaking New Ground (Baybridge 1983)
Mal Waldron Plays Eric Satie (Baybridge, 1983)
You and the Night and the Music (Paddle Wheel, 1983)
The Git Go - Live at the Village Vanguard (Soul Note, 1986)
The Seagulls of Kristiansund (Soul Note, 1986)
With Wadada Leo Smith
The Blue Mountain's Sun Drummer (Kabell, 2010)

References

External links
 Ed Blackwell discography

1929 births
1992 deaths
Free jazz drummers
Jazz musicians from New Orleans
African-American drummers
American jazz drummers
Wesleyan University faculty
Enja Records artists
Black Saint/Soul Note artists
Avant-garde jazz drummers
20th-century American drummers
American male drummers
20th-century American male musicians
American male jazz musicians
Old and New Dreams members
20th-century African-American musicians